Teluk Bayur Grand Mosque, also known as Surau Ateh, is an old mosque in Indonesia which is located near the Port of Teluk Bayur, South Padang district, Padang, West Sumatra. Although the mosque was previously a surau (Islamic assembly building) which was recorded to have stood since the 17th Century, the building which stands on current location was built during the Dutch colonization around the 19th Century.

Today, other than being used as a religious site of Islam, the first floor of the mosque is also used as an educational place for the religion and a studying place for Pesantren (Islamic boarding school).

History 
The mosque has been established since the 17th Century but previously was a surau which was located at the different place from the current building. The surau was founded by an Arabic merchant named Abdullah, who was known to have been killed by being involved in a fight against the Dutch East India Company that was taking control of the Bayur region in 1696.

The current mosque was built following the expansion of Bayur Bay area by the Dutch East Indies in 1888. At the time, all trading activities and sea transportation took place at the port, including the departure of hajj pilgrims who would perform the pilgrimage after a ritual activity in the Ganting Grand Mosque. Because of its location adjacent to the Bayur Bay port, this mosque, which was then still a surau, became more crowded than usual during the hajj season as it was packed with hajj pilgrims.

At first, the shape of the mosque was made simple, with a wall made of wood and a roof made of pua leaves. In 1911, it was restored for the first time and one of the wall was replaced with rock using cement which was imported from Semen Padang (cement factory) in Indarung.

See also 
 Port of Teluk Bayur

References 
 Footnotes

 Bibliography

 

Mosques in Padang
Cultural Properties of Indonesia in West Sumatra
Dutch colonial architecture in Indonesia
Islam in West Sumatra